Philip Miller (1691–1771) was an English botanist.

Philip or Phil Miller may also refer to:
Philip Miller (composer) (born 1964), South African composer
Philip R. Miller (1918–1989), judge of the United States Court of Federal Claims
Phil Miller (1949–2017), English guitarist
Phil Miller (American football) (born c. 1933), American football coach
Phil Miller (politician) (born c. 1952), American politician in the Iowa House of Representatives
Phil Miller (The Last Man on Earth), a character on The Last Man on Earth